Sarah Mather (1796, in Brooklyn – June 21, 1868) was an American inventor, best remembered for patenting the first underwater telescope, a predecessor of the periscope in 1845.

Background 
Born Sarah Porter Stiman, she was born in New York in 1796. While not much is known about her background as a person, it is believed she married Harlow Mather in 1819 and they had one child in Brooklyn, New York They lived the rest of their lives in Brooklyn and that is where their family lived for the remainder of their lives. Brooklyn was not only her family’s home but the home of her invention as well, the submarine telescope. Later on, her daughter improved upon the design to bring it a more modern approach.

Invention of the submarine telescope 

Working through the design thinking process, she worked to make an improvement to a product that already existed. Of course, there was the invention of the telescope that allowed people to examine the stars, but there was yet to be an object to examine what rests in the ocean. The goal was to examine the hulls of vessels and discover objects under water. This was where she could capitalize in the market as there was nothing quite like it. Innovating and thinking about how her invention would work, she made multiple sketches and detailed drawings. After thinking of all of the details, she finally applied for a patent. She was granted the patent on July 5, 1864 for an “Improvement in Submarine Telescopes”. 
	Her innovation was key in the Civil War as it helped to detect wrecks and other boundaries in the ocean. Her innovation helped the north to discover marine movements by the Confederates. It also helped in search missions for missing vessels. One unique feature is that this telescope was most often used above the water rather than under the water.

Impact on contemporary society 

There are multiple uses for the submarine telescope today that mirror that from the 1800s. Submarine telescopes are continued to be used in search and rescue missions for boats and planes that land in the sea. They also are used in discovery missions of wrecks from history and have unveiled many historic wrecks from the past. They are also used in marine combat as well as being able to anticipate the movement of submarines as well as missiles and other potential threats. This has greatly expanded the scope of modern marine combat. Now today, concepts from the submarine telescope are being used in medicine. Some of the endoscopic technology from modern submarine telescopes has been used in holograms. These holograms are used as a visual representation of the interference pattern. It will be interesting to see how the medical field will continue to flourish with the concepts of this innovation and how it will grow with the use of telescopes like this.

References 

1796 births
1868 deaths
American inventors